Anton Bratkov (born 14 May 1993) is a Ukrainian professional footballer who plays as a centre back for Armenian Premier League club Pyunik.

Career
Bratkov is a product of the FC Vidradnyi and FC Dynamo Kyiv youth sportive schools and signed 3,5 years contract with FC Dynamo in the Ukrainian Premier League in December 2012.

Dynamo-2 Kyiv
In 2011 he started to play for Dynamo-2 Kyiv for three season in Ukrainian First League.

Desna Chernihiv
In 2016 he moved to Desna Chernihiv, the main club of the city of Chernihiv. Here he got promoted in Ukrainian Premier League after the season 2017–18 of Ukrainian First League.

Zirka Kropyvnytskyi
In 2018 he played 13 matches with Zirka Kropyvnytskyi in Ukrainian First League.

Desna Chernihiv
In 2018 he moved back to Desna Chernihiv in Ukrainian Premier League where he played 16 matches in Ukrainian Premier League in the season 2018-19 helping the club to stay in the top league without relegate.

Maccabi Petah Tikva
In January 2019 he moved he terminated his contracts with the club of Chernihiv by mutual consent and he moved to Maccabi Petah Tikva in Liga Leumit where he played 1 match in the season 2018–19.

Lviv
In 2019 he moved to Lviv, where he played 30 matches in Ukrainian Premier League.

Metalist 1925 Kharkiv
In 2020 he moved to Metalist 1925 Kharkiv, where he contribute for the promotion to Ukrainian Premier League after the season 2020–21 in Ukrainian First League.

Pyunik Yerevan
In 2021 he moved to Pyunik Yerevan in Armenian Premier League. Here in played nine matches in the 2020–21 Armenian Premier League season and one match in the 2020–21 Armenian Cup. He won the 2021–22 Armenian Premier League, qualifying for the 2022–23 UEFA Champions League. On 5 July 2022 he played against CFR Cluj in the first qualifying round of the Champions League, eventually exiting to tournament in the third qualifying round against Red Star Belgrade.

International career
In 2012 he was called up by the Ukraine under-21 side, with whom he earned second place in the 2013 Commonwealth of Independent States Cup. In 2014 iteration, he won the tournament.

Career statistics

Club

Honours
Pyunik
 Armenian Premier League: 2021–22

Metalist 1925 Kharkiv
 Ukrainian First League: 2020–21

Desna Chernihiv
 Ukrainian First League: 2017–18
 Ukrainian First League: Runner Up 2016–17

Veres Rivne
 Ukrainian Second League: 2015–16

Dynamo-2 Kyiv
 Ukrainian Premier League Reserves: 2015–16

Ukraine national under-21
Commonwealth of Independent States Cup: 2014
Commonwealth of Independent States Cup: Runner-up 2013

References

External links
 Profile from Official Site of Pyunik
 
 

Ukrainian footballers
Ukrainian expatriate footballers
Association football defenders
1993 births
Living people
Sportspeople from Kropyvnytskyi
FC Dynamo-2 Kyiv players
NK Veres Rivne players
FC Desna Chernihiv players
FC Zirka Kropyvnytskyi players
Expatriate footballers in Israel
Israeli Premier League players
Maccabi Petah Tikva F.C. players
Ukrainian expatriate sportspeople in Israel
FC Lviv players
FC Metalist 1925 Kharkiv players
FC Pyunik players
Ukrainian Premier League players
Ukrainian First League players
Armenian Premier League players
Expatriate footballers in Armenia
Ukrainian expatriate sportspeople in Armenia
Ukraine youth international footballers
Ukraine under-21 international footballers